Walter Neumann-Silkow (10 April 1894 – 9 December 1941) was a German general during World War II who commanded several divisions. He was a recipient of the Knight's Cross of the Iron Cross of Nazi Germany. Neumann-Silkow died of wounds on 9 December 1941 at a military hospital in Italian Libya. He was posthumously promoted to Generalleutnant.

Awards and decorations

 Knight's Cross of the Iron Cross on 5 August 1940 as Oberst and commander of 8. Schützen-Brigade

References

Citations

Bibliography

1894 births
1941 deaths
German Army personnel killed in World War II
German Army personnel of World War I
Lieutenant generals of the German Army (Wehrmacht)
People from the Province of Pomerania
People from Słupsk County
Prussian Army personnel
Recipients of the Knight's Cross of the Iron Cross
Reichswehr personnel
German Army generals of World War II